The Ibn Sina Robot is the world's first android robot with Arabic language conversational abilities. Created by roboticists Nikolaos Mavridis and Hanson Robotics founder David Hanson at United Arab Emirates University's Interactive Robots and Media Lab, Ibn Sina was named after the famous 11th century Persian polymath (Avicenna). The robot is capable of facial expressions, hand gestures, Arabic language dialogue, face detection and face recognition. It is part of an Interactive Theatre installation, within a circular room with a diameter of 13 meters, containing a stage, a projection screen, and sensors. Experimentation regarding multiple forms of tele-participation in the theatre is taking place; such as live interactions between physically present robots and humans with avatars in online virtual worlds, and remote control of robots through brain-computer interfacing.

The robot was demonstrated in the GITEX 2009 exhibition in Dubai, where it interacted with more than one thousand visitors, and has been featured in world media numerous times such as the UAE National, BBC, Agence France Press (AFP), Al Jazeera and others.

Further reading

 Riek et al. 2010. Ibn Sina Steps Out: Exploring Arabic Attitudes Toward Humanoid Robots. 
 Mavridis et al. 2011. Transforming IbnSina into an advanced multilingual interactive android robot.

External links

Video of IbnSina Robot greeting in Arabic and showing facial expressions
Video of IbnSina Robot Interacting with students in Arabic
Official website of the Interactive Robots and Media Lab (IRML)
IRML pavilion at the online robotics expo Expo21xx
IRML videos youtube channel

References 

Robots of the United Arab Emirates
Androids
2009 robots
United Arab Emirates University